Farmers' Review was a weekly newspaper published in Chicago, Illinois starting in 1877. It was founded by A. Moore. In 1883 it was purchased and managed by Hannibal H. Chandler and edited by Oscar C. Gibbs. In 1909 it was bought by National Stockman and Farmer Company. The main focus of the newspaper was agriculture and livestock production.

References

External links 
 Illinois Digital Newspaper Collection: Farmers' Review (1879-1918)

Agricultural magazines
Newspapers established in 1877
Weekly newspaper companies of the United States
Defunct newspapers published in Chicago
Defunct weekly newspapers
Publications with year of disestablishment missing
1877 establishments in Illinois